Livia Leu Agosti is a Swiss diplomat. She is the first female ambassador of Switzerland to France and former Swiss Ambassador to Iran. She served as the ambassador in 2008, succeeding Philip Walty. Agosti was the first European female ambassador and the second female ambassador to serve in Iran after Sierra Leone's Ambassador, Hajia Alari Cole.

Career
She was previously a member of the Swiss delegation to the United Nations in New York, the vice chairman of the Swiss delegation in Cairo, and a member of the group responsible for dealing with the nuclear program of Iran.

Before serving as the Ambassador to Iran, Agosti was the head of the African and European Department of the Ministry of Foreign Affairs of Switzerland. Leu Agosti, has brought her sons, along with her husband, to Iran.

Her husband, who is a biologist, an expert, and a researcher in the field of ants, is busy working in Iran. Before her departure, she announced that she would send her children to a German school in Iran.

In 2018 she became the first woman to be the Swiss Ambassador to France.

See also
 Iran–Switzerland relations

References

Living people
21st-century diplomats
21st-century Swiss politicians
21st-century Swiss women politicians
1961 births
Ambassadors of Switzerland to France
People from Zürich
Swiss women diplomats
Swiss women ambassadors